Segundo Olmedo (born 20 April 1948) is a Panamanian former wrestler who competed in the 1972 Summer Olympics and in the 1976 Summer Olympics. At the 1975 Pan American Games he finished third in the 74 kg Greco-Roman category and placed sixth in the 68 kg freestyle category. At the 1979 Pan American Games he finished fifth in the 68 kg freestyle category.

References

External links
 

1948 births
Living people
Panamanian male sport wrestlers
Olympic wrestlers of Panama
Wrestlers at the 1972 Summer Olympics
Wrestlers at the 1976 Summer Olympics
Pan American Games bronze medalists for Panama
Pan American Games medalists in wrestling
Wrestlers at the 1975 Pan American Games
Wrestlers at the 1979 Pan American Games
Medalists at the 1975 Pan American Games
20th-century Panamanian people
21st-century Panamanian people